The ISOCELL CMOS camera sensors are a family of sensors produced by Samsung and available for purchase by other companies. They are used in a wide variety of products including mobile phones, computers and digital cameras.

Design
These sensors use one of the following pixel type technologies:
FSI: frontside-illuminated. The light that reaches the photosensitive area is reduced because it needs to pass through multiple metal and dielectric layers.
BSI: backside-illuminated.The metal wiring shifted to backside of photosensitive area(photodiode). The light reaches the photosensitive area directly.
ISOCELL: ISOCELL combines 3D-BSI with Front-side, Full-depth, Deep-Trench Isolation (F-DTI) and Vertical Transfer Gate (VTG). This  provides increased light sensitivity and higher color fidelity even in poor lighting conditions.
ISOCELL Plus: ISOCELL Plus replaces ISOCELL's metal grid barriers with an innovative new material developed by Fujifilm. This minimizes optical loss and light reflection, providing higher color fidelity and up to a 15% enhancement in light sensitivity compared to ISOCELL.
ISOCELL 2.0: ISOCELL 2.0 builds on ISOCELL Plus technology by additionally replacing the lower portion of the color filter barriers with a more reflective material. It further reduces optical loss in each pixel and drastically improves light sensitivity producing even more vivid pictures with reduced noise.

These sensors can be configured with one of the following chroma technologies:

 BW also known as Monochrome. No color filter array.
 RGB also known as Bayer filter or RGGB. Features a repeating 2×2 pattern with 1 red, 2 green and 1 blue pixels.
 Tetracell also known as Quad Bayer or 4-cell. For darker scenes, signal processing can combine data from 2x2 pixel groups to essentially act like a larger pixel with a repeating 4×4 subpixel pattern with 4 red, 8 green and 4 blue subpixels. For brighter scenes, signal processing can convert the Tetracell into a conventional RGB filter to achieve 4x higher resolution. Resolution & pixel size listed below is after re-mosaic signal processing.
Nonacell is similar to Tetracell, but with 3x3 pixel groups and a 6×6 pattern with 9 red, 18 green and 9 blue subpixels.
ChameleonCell is similar to Tetracell and Nonacell, but with 4x4 pixel groups and a 8x8 pattern with 16 red, 32 green and 16 blue subpixels.

List of sensors

1: The Galaxy S7 family utilizes either one of two sensors: the Samsung S5K2L1 or the Sony IMX260. They are regarded as nearly identical sensors.

2: The Galaxy S6 family and Note 5 utilizes either one of two sensors: the Samsung S5K2P2 or the Sony IMX240. They are regarded as nearly identical sensors.

3: The Xiaomi Mi 4C and Oneplus X utilize either one of two sensors: the Samsung S5K3M2 or the Sony IMX258. They are similar sensors, but the IMX258 is a newer unit.

4: The Galaxy S8 family utilizes either one of two sensors: the Samsung S5K2L2 or the Sony IMX333. They are regarded as nearly identical sensors.

5: The Xiaomi Mi 6 has two sensors. One of the two sensors is S5K3M3, another is Sony IMX386.

6: The Meizu Pro 6 family utilizes either one of two sensors: the Samsung S5K3M3 or the Sony IMX386, They are regarded as nearly identical sensors

7: The Xiaomi Mi Max 2 utilizes either one of two sensors: the Samsung S5K3M3 or the Sony IMX386. They are regarded as nearly identical sensors

8: The Samsung Galaxy S9 and S9+ utilize either one of two sensors: the Samsung S5K2L3 or the Sony IMX345. Both feature stacked LPDDR4 DRAM in the CMOS sensor.

9: The Galaxy S8 family utilizes either one of two sensors: the Samsung S5K3H1 or the Sony IMX320. They are regarded as nearly identical sensors.

10: The Galaxy S10 family utilizes either one of two sensors: the Samsung S5K3J1 or the Sony IMX374. They are regarded as nearly identical sensors.

11: The Galaxy Z Flip's ultra-wide camera utilizes the 16 Mp sensor, but images are cropped down to 12 Mp.

12: The Galaxy S21 and S21+ utilizes either one of two sensors: the Samsung 2LD (Exynos variant) or the Sony IMX555 (Snapdragon variant). They are regarded as nearly identical sensors.

13: The backlight sensor is a special photographic sensor. It allows you to take high quality, clear photos in low light. The BSI sensor improves image sharpness during shooting.

See also 

 Exmor
 Bionz – image processor
 HAD CCD – Sony
 Expeed – Nikon image/video processors
 Toshiba CMOS
 OmniVision

References

External links 
 Samsung ISOCELL Image Sensor Official Website | Samsung

Image sensor products
Samsung